Kurunegala is a district in North Western Province, Sri Lanka. It consists of 14 Electorate Divisions, 02 Municipal Council, 19 Urban Councils, 15 Parliamentary Ministers, 47 Provincial Council Members, 15 Ministers and 337 Local Council Members.

Geography 
Considering Geographical Situation of the Kurunegala District, it has been bounded by six Districts. From the North by Anuradhapura District, East by Mathale and Kandy District, South By Gampaha and Kegalle District and from West by Puttlam District. Longitude location of the District is north Latitude 228- 333 and East Latitude 104–178.

History
Kurunegala has very special historical background among other Districts. That is it consists of four ancient kingdoms namely Panduwasnuwara, Kurunegala, Yapahuwa and Dambadeniya.

Demographic details
As a percentage of Total population of Sri Lanka, Kurunegala District has 7.3% of the population. According to the census data, the estimated population of Kurunegala in the year 2001 was 1.4 Million. Majority of Kurunegala District's residents belong to the Sinhalese majority. Other ethnic minorities include the Sri Lankan Moors, Sri Lankan Tamils, Burghers and Malays. Residents from ethnic minorities live in all parts of the District.

The following Table summarizes the population of Kurunegala according to different ethnicity:

Language
The common languages of Kurunegala, depending on social classes, social circles, and ethnic backgrounds are Sinhalese, Tamil and English.

Religion

Buddhism is the main and the most widely practised religion in Kurunegala. The town is also home to a wide range of other religious faiths and sects including Islam, Christianity and Hinduism.

Christian/Catholic churches, mosques and Hindu temples are also located within the city. The Church of Ceylon, which is the Anglican Church in Sri Lanka operates a diocese in Kurunegala covering the North-Central province and Kurunegala, Kandy, Matale and Kegalle, Anuradapura, Polonnaruwa districts.

Economy

Education 
Kurunegala District has 6 Educational Zones, 869 Schools including 28 National Schools, and the District has 20,006 Teachers.

Climate 
Kurunegala features a tropical rainforest climate under the Köppen climate classification. The city's climate is tropical and hot all throughout the year. The surrounding rocks play a major role in determining Kurunegala's weather since these rocks increase and retain the heat of the day. The only major change in the Kurunegala weather occurs during the monsoons from May to August and October to January, this is the time of year where heavy rains can be expected. While the city does experience a noticeably drier weather during January and February, it does not qualify as a true dry season as average precipitation in both months are above . In general, temperatures from late November to mid February period are lower than the rest of the year. Middle rainfall of this District is 900 - 2200 ml. North East Monsoon and South West Monsoon are the main rainfall method in this district. South West Monsoon is the largest rainfall system.

Canals and rivers 
Considering water supply system of the district it consists of Four Canals bounded on the North by Kala oya, Central by Meeoya and Deduru oya, South by Ma oya. There are many Large Scale and Small Irrigation Systems that has been implemented based on these canals. These are Rajanganaya, Usgala, Siyambalangamuwa, Hakwatunawa, Kimbulwana Oya, Bathalagoda, Magalla, Palukadawala, Atharagalla, Mediyawa, Wennoruwa and Ambakolawewa are some of the examples.

Major cities

 Kurunegala (Municipal Council)

Big towns

 Kuliyapitiya (Urban Council)

Other towns

References

 
Districts of Sri Lanka